The following list of best-selling music artists includes those music acts from the 20th century to the present with claims of 75 million or more record sales worldwide. This information cannot be listed officially, as there is no organization that has recorded global music sales.

The tables are listed with each artist's claimed sales figure(s) and their total independently certified units and are ranked in descending order by claimed sales. If two or more artists have the same claimed sales, they are then ranked by certified units. The claimed sales figure and the total of certified units (for each country) within the provided sources include sales of albums, singles, compilation-albums, music videos as well as downloads of singles and full-length albums. Sales figures, such as those from SoundScan, which are sometimes published by Billboard magazine, have not been included in the certified units column.

Definitions

Gold/Platinum certifications issued after 2016, especially on singles, are in some cases more than 50% streaming generated. Some of the 20th century artists can also have significant amount of streaming based certifications. The certified units of the newer artists may sometimes be higher than their listed claimed figures. This is because Recording Industry Association of America (RIAA) and almost all other certifying bodies count streaming towards Gold and Platinum thresholds required for Digital Single Award certification. For this reason, some singles and even albums get over certified by hundreds of thousands of units. The over certified figures, however, are often in millions of units for RIAA certifications, one such example is Rihanna's single "We Found Love", which is certified at nine times Platinum by the RIAA, yet during the time of the certification, it had sold 5.4 million downloads.

The certified units for some artists/bands who have multi-disc albums can be higher than their listed claimed figures due to the RIAA counting each unit within set as one unit toward certification. The certified units also can be inflated by the redundancy of certifications, because each of tracks downloads and streams contributed to the certifications of both of the single and the respective album. The RIAA counts 10 downloads of individual track as well as 1,500 audio/video streams as an equivalent to one unit of album, including those from singles released prior to the album release. Theoretically, if one song were streamed 1.5 billion times on YouTube, the single would receive Diamond and the whole album could be certified Platinum, thus creating a combined total of 11 million certified units without any sales. Kanye West's album The Life of Pablo achieved Platinum without selling a single copy and was only available for streaming.

Issued certifications for songs which have been recorded by multiple artists including featured artists are added to each artist's total amount of certified units, as all the artists would have played a significant part in a song. For example, "This Is What You Came For" and "Where Them Girls At" include Rihanna and Flo Rida, Nicki Minaj as featured artists respectively, so the certifications issued for these songs are added to the total amount of certified units for all involved artists. However, the certifications issued for songs that have been recorded by four or more artists are not included as the artists involved would have played minor roles, examples of such songs are Kanye West's "Monster" and/or "All Day".

Standards
 To ensure the highest level of fact checking and editorial control, this list sources sales figures to news organizations and highly regarded music industry related organizations such as Billboard.
 The figures of total certified units within the tables below are based on certified units of albums, singles (including digital downloads) and videos.
 Markets' order within the tables is based on Retail Value: each market generates respectively, the largest market at the top and smallest at the bottom.
 The column for certified sales includes markets, the databases of which contain certifications representing figures of 100,000 and more.

Artists by reputed sales

250 million or more records

200 million to 249 million records

120 million to 199 million records

100 million to 119 million records

80 million to 99 million records

75 million to 79 million records

See also

 List of best-selling albums
 List of best-selling singles
 List of best-selling boy groups
 List of best-selling girl groups
 List of best-selling female rappers
 IFPI Global Recording Artist of the Year

Notes

References

Musicians
Best-selling
Rock music
Popular music